Hyperlais siccalis is a species of moth in the family Crambidae described by Achille Guenée in 1854. It is found in France and Spain.

The wingspan is about 20 mm.

References

Moths described in 1854
Cybalomiinae
Moths of Europe
Insects of Turkey